Dr. Raja Rai Rajeshwar Bali Bahadur  MLC was born in a prominent royal family of Rampur-Daryabad. His father, Rai Narain Bali Bahadur, taluqdar died early when he was only 10 years old. After completing his studies, he took over the reins of his state as 13th Taluqdar.
Dariyabad was the biggest Kayastha State in Awadh. Currently situated in the state of Uttar Pradesh (United Provinces).

Life
He was an intellectual reformist. During his lifetime, he was the head of the Taluqdar association of Oudh. From 1924 to 1928, he was the education minister of Uttar Pradesh. Under the Diarchial System of Government of India Act 1919, he was elected to the United Provinces Legislative Council from the non-Muslim Rural Area of Barabanki district.

His main contributions were the passage of the Agra University act, the creation of Bhatkhande College of Hindustani Music, and the passing of the primary education system of education in India.

Taluqdari in office 
From July 1924June 1928
Minister of Education, Medical Relief & Public Health and Local Self Government of the UP legislative assembly in 1920 and represented the Non-Muslim rural constituency of Barabanki district. He was appointed an Officer of the Order of the British Empire in the 1919 New Year Honours appointed by King George V of the United Kingdom and the British Dominions, and Emperor of India .
The passing of the Agra University Act and Primary Education Bill in UP Assembly was also due to his efforts. For this, he was not only conferred a Degree of the Doctor of literature by the Lucknow University, but his name was given a place in honor in the Encyclopedia of Great Men of the World, published from the USA.

After getting the ministry Raja Saheb gave concrete shape to the development schemes he had kept to his heart. A wave of reforms started flowing through during his ministership. Establishment of different educational institutions and several community health services without discrimination to religion, caste or creed were hallmark of his tenure. It was his ardent wish that no foreigner can call his countrymen illiterate and uncultured. He chalked out several educational and health schemes and made the government provide maximum financial assistance.

After independence the prime minister of India Pandit Jawahar Lal Nehru disclosed to Sri Mahesh Chandra, a senior journalist a leading daily The Statesman that he and other prominent Congressmen had Rai Rajeshwar Bali's name in mind for the first President of India.

University of Lucknow 
Right from his early days he had passion to make educational institutions prosperous and also to participate in their programs. University of Lucknow had a special place in his heart. He contributed towards its annual membership from his estate from 1917 when it was known as Canning College. As reported in History of Lucknow University Vol 1 (1921-1951) by B.N.Puri, when the first meeting of Lucknow University Court was held on 21 March 1921 under the presidency of Chancellor Sir Harcourt Butler, Rai Rajeshwar Bali was among those top 45 members who attended it. Rai Rajeshwar Bali also gave his contribution in development of Lucknow University. The university honoured him for his services with 'Doctor of Literature' in its convocation in 1936. Later he was member of executive council of the university for several years. A gold medal in Hindi department is awarded annually in his name by the University of Lucknow.

In the early part of the 20th century the Hindustani music was confined to temples. Dr Rai Rajeshwar Bali was instrumental in bringing the Hindustani classical music to the public by opening one of the first music colleges of India called the Bhatkhande College of Hindustani Music in Lucknow. For this he invited Pundit V. N. Bhatkhande and requested him to write the grammar of Hindustani Classical Music. Dr Rai Rajeshwar Bali was also an avid Krishna Bhakt and his Phag and Panje are still recited in Vrindavan, the lila sthal of Bhagwan Krishna. Rai Rajeshwar Bali, at the age of 27, earned great respect and awe for his creative activities and was recognized among stalwarts like Rabindranath Tagore, Dr. Radhakrishnan, Pandit Madan Mohan Malviya and others, who had regular interactions with him on cultural matters.
Purely in recognition of his brilliant creative activities, the then Governor of UP Sir William Marris appointed Rai Rajeshwar Bali as the Minister of Education in 1922.

Other prominent works 
Rai Rajeshwar Bali was appointed Chairman of the U.P. Franchise Committee on 26 Jan 1932 the main aim of which was to decide the voting rights to women and representation of backward classes and labour classes.

In 1924, he also built a new palace in Dariyabad in the finest Hindustani Architectural style & encouraged his family members to develop their talent in Hindustani Music.

The Kayastha community out of great affection and respect felt proud in making him the President of the All India Kayastha Conference in 1933 Hindu Educational Society requested him and he accepted and was its chairman from 1929 until 1944. Later in 1957 a hostel of the Society's Civil Engineering School in Lucknow was named after him.

Dr Rai Rajeshwar Bali was succeeded by his eldest son Rai Dinanath Bali. Rai Kaushlendra Bali, his youngest son was also an avid Krishna and Ram Bhakt and wrote many poems. In 2011,2012 & 2013 he received national language pride award from Akhil Bhartiya Hindi Seva Sansthan for his work in Hindi Literature.

Raja Rai Dinanath Bali took over the state in 1944 and became the last ruling taluqdar of Rampur-Dariyabad state.

External links
 1919 New Year Honours (OBE)
 www.balifamily.net
 http://bhatkhandemusic.edu.in/history/#
 Bhatkhande Sangit Vidyapith
 Dariyabad, Barabanki
 Bhatkhande Music Institute University
 List of Ministers, Vidhan Sabha, Uttar Pradesh
 History of Bhatkhande Music Institute, Lucknow
 Awards of memorial medal at University of Lucknow, Uttar Pradesh
 Royalty - Barabanki District
 Taluqdar

Notes

Indian royalty
Officers of the Order of the British Empire
1889 births
1944 deaths
People from Barabanki, Uttar Pradesh